The Mack F series was the third generation of cabover trucks from Mack Trucks. Its production began in 1962 and ended in 1981. It was produced primarily as a set-forward axle truck but a setback axle version was shipped overseas (from the USA). The cab came in a 50 inch (1371.6 mm) day cab (no sleeper). Sleeper models included a 72 inch (1828.8 mm), 80 inch (2032 mm) and later a "bustle back" was added that lengthened the sleeper to 86 inches (2184.4 mm).

Model range
F6xx
F7xx
F8xx
F9xx

Engines
The F Model offered 5 different diesel engines, Mack's Maxidyne and Thermodyne at 260-375 hp, Cummins - 250-350 hp, Detroit Diesel - 270-430 hp and Caterpillar - 325 hp. 

Cat3406 is a big-bore diesel available in both high-torque-rise and conventional torque-rise versions
Detroit Diesel 71 series, provided power with a high torque curve.
Cummins Formula 350 “Big Cam” engine is governed at 1900RPM and provides 1065 ft-lbs of torque at 1300RPM. The formula 290 is also governed at 1900RPM and provides 930 ft-lbs of torque. The NTC series of engines was also available.

The table shows the Mack diesel engines available in the series.

Chassis
The Mack F series truck uses taper-leaf front springs, which helps to provide a smoother ride. Taper-lead springs practically eliminate the inter-leaf friction, which is common with multi-leaf spring systems. The taper concept uses springs of equal length and different contour, to assure the springs do not slide against one another while in normal operation. This arrangement, accompanied by forged aluminum rear brackets and shackles equate to a comfortable ride. 
Constructed from drop-forged I-beam construction. 
Power steering is available.
Rear axles rated to 
Maximum GCWR

Chassis Equipment
50 Gallon Fuel Tank
Automatic reset circuit breakers
Back-up Light
Break-away safety valve
Cab roof vent
Combination heater and defroster, 42000 BTU
Combination stop, tail, and rear turn signals(2)
Engine water conditioner (cummins engine)
Engine stop control
Horn, electric, single tone
I.D. & clearance lamps
Low air pressure buzzer
Two rear view mirror
Undercoating
Vertical exhaust

See also
Mack Trucks
List of Mack Trucks Products

References

Cab over vehicles
F
Vehicles introduced in 1962
Tractor units